Michael J. Burke (born October 28, 1958) is an American lawyer who served as a justice of the Supreme Court of Illinois from 2020 to 2022. He was previously a judge on the Illinois Second District Appellate Court.

Early life and education 
Michael J. Burke was born in Chicago on October 28, 1958. He received a Bachelor of Science magna cum laude in 1980 from Northern Illinois University and a Juris Doctor with highest distinction from UIC John Marshall Law School in 1984.

Legal career 

Burke began his career in the DuPage County State's Attorney's Office in 1983, becoming Chief of the Special Prosecutions Unit in 1991.

Judicial career 

He served as an associate judge of the 18th Judicial Circuit from 1992 to 2001 and as a Circuit Judge from 2001 to 2008. While serving on the Circuit Court, he was the Presiding Judge of the Misdemeanor/Traffic Division. In July 2008, he was assigned to the Appellate Court.

On February 10, 2020, the Supreme Court of Illinois appointed Burke to fill the vacancy left by Robert R. Thomas who retired effective on February 29, 2020. Burke served until December 5, 2022.

With his residence redistricted to the Illinois Supreme Court's 3rd district from the 2nd district (which was the seat he had been appointed to), Burke is running for election in 2022 to the 3rd district seat.

Personal life 

Burke and his wife Mary Ann have four children. They live in Elmhurst, Illinois.

References

External links 

1958 births
Living people
20th-century American lawyers
21st-century American judges
Illinois Republicans
Illinois state court judges
Justices of the Illinois Supreme Court
John Marshall Law School (Chicago) alumni
Judges of the Illinois Appellate Court
Lawyers from Chicago
Northern Illinois University alumni